The Piano Concerto No. 13 in C major, K. 415 (387b) by Wolfgang Amadeus Mozart was composed in Vienna in 1782–83. It is the third of the first three full concertos Mozart composed for his subscription concerts.

It consists of three movements:

Allegro, in C major and common (C) time 
Andante, in F major and 3/4 time
Allegro, in C major and 6/8 time

The average duration of performance of Concerte für das Pianoforte (vol. 2, no.13), is 23 minutes.

Instrumentation: solo – piano (or harpsichord); orchestra: 2 oboes, 2 bassoons + 2 horns, 2 trumpets + timpani + strings.

[Note: As per Mozart's own instructions, this concerto can also be performed with an orchestral scoring of strings alone without wind.]

Assessment and reception

This concerto has long had an ambiguous reputation. The first movement starts with a quiet theme, similar to that of the later C major Concerto No. 21, but introduced fugato. The orchestral introduction builds to an impressive tutti, but many writers, including Hutchings and Girdlestone, have considered that after the entry of the keyboard this early promise is somewhat dissipated. The keyboard part itself consists of passages that do not integrate well with the fugato treatment of the ritornellic material, and, as Hutchings comments, the result is that the "whole is less than the sum of the parts".

References

 Girdlestone, C. M. 1997. Mozart's piano concertos. Cassell, London. 
 Hutchings, A. A Companion to Mozart's Piano Concertos, Oxford University Press. 
 Mozart, W. A. Piano Concertos Nos. 11–16 in full score. Dover Publications, New York.

External links
 
 

13
1783 compositions
Compositions in C major